Dénis Pinho Martins (born 30 June 1997, in Leiria) is a Portuguese professional footballer who plays for U.D. Leiria as a central defender.

References

External links

Portuguese League profile 

1997 births
Living people
People from Leiria
Portuguese footballers
Association football defenders
Liga Portugal 2 players
Campeonato de Portugal (league) players
Vitória S.C. B players
U.D. Vilafranquense players
U.D. Leiria players
Portugal youth international footballers
Sportspeople from Leiria District